Lakhonia is a genus of beetles in the family Buprestidae, containing the following species:

 Lakhonia coomani (Bourgoin, 1924)
 Lakhonia harmandi Descarpentries & Villiers, 1967
 Lakhonia tonkinea Descarpentries & Villiers, 1967

This name is a primary junior homonym of Lakhonia Yang, 1936. The correct replacement name is Svataea Alonso-Zarazaga & Roca-Cusachs 2017.

References

Buprestidae genera